De La Salle College is an integrated Catholic secondary boys' school in the south of Auckland, New Zealand. Established in 1953 by the De La Salle Brothers, it continues to educate young men in the Catholic faith and Christian values. In New Zealand there are two schools along with De La Salle College established by the Brothers in New Zealand.  Francis Douglas Memorial College in New Plymouth and John Paul College in Rotorua. Students are encouraged to develop every aspect of their person and a strong emphasis is placed on excellence in academic study, cultural pride and sporting ability. Applicants need to be willing to support the Catholic character of the College.

Philosophy
De La Salle College is a Lasallian educational institution, based on Christian and Catholic values. The college motto is "Fight the Good Fight of Faith". Prayer and worship are emphasised in the life of the college. The college students bear a crest on their uniform in the shape of a shield with a cross in the middle and the words 'Bonum Certamen Certa' which are the Latin words for the motto.

History
De La Salle College was established in 1953.

In 2008 a new gymnasium was opened, replacing the previous gym, which was opened in 1969. Guests of honour included Prime Minister Helen Clark, Bishop Patrick Dunn, Manukau Mayor Len Brown, as well as past associates with the college. The old gym has been divided into technology suites and material workshops.

In 2012, former St Peters College deputy headmaster Myles Hogarty replaced Br David Miller as principal, ending a 60-year tradition of a De La Salle Brother principalship.

Houses
The house system of De La Salle College places students into one of four houses, each named after a De La Salle Brother. This system is used for events such as inter-house athletics.

Sports
The school has taught many notable sportsmen. De La Salle has produced many great sporting talents including All Black great John Kirwan and Kiwi Rugby League player Francis Leota. In recent times the most notable is All Black Isaia Toeava, Motu Tony (NZ Warriors, Kiwi's) and Henry Fa'afili (NZ Warriors, Kiwi's and Manu Samoa), Lesley Vainikolo (Canberra Raiders, Kiwi's and England Rugby International), Junior Poluleuligaga (Waikato Chiefs, Manu Samoa), George Carmont (Newcastle Knights, Toa Samoa, Wigan Warriors), Jeff Lima (Melbourne Storm, Kiwi's) and the late Sonny Fai (NZ Warriors).

The 2008 De La Salle 1st XV have had great success, winning not only the Auckland title, but the National title. The team traveled to Japan in 2009 for further competition.

Available sports
In winter, Rugby, football, and basketball are offered. In the summer, volleyball, kilikiti, waka ama, softball, and cricket are offered. New Zealand Secondary Schools Rugby Champions 2008.

Demographics
Last visited by Education Review Office (ERO) on 29 June 2016. The next review is scheduled within three years (2019).

De La Salle College had 996 students enrolled and all were males. Out of those, 66% were Samoan, 16% are Tongans, 8% Māori, 4% Cook Islands Māori, and 6% were of other ethnicity.

Notable alumni

Education
Patrick Lynch , New Zealand Catholic education administrator.

Literary
Ta'afuli Andrew Fiu – Author of Purple Heart, Random House 2006; motivational speaker.

Broadcasting
Ric Salizzo – TV personality; SportsCafe presenter.

Public service
Len Brown – Mayor of Auckland (2011–2016), Mayor of Manukau City (2007–2010)

Sport

Rugby league
Isaak Ah Mau - player, Brisbane Broncos, North Queensland Cowboys
Mark Leafa - South Sydney, Sydney Roosters, Leigh Centurions & Castleford Tigers
Leeson Ah Mau – player, Junior Warriors & North Queensland Cowboys
George Carmont – player, Wigan Warriors & Samoa
Henry Fa'afili – player, Warriors, Kiwis & Warrington
Mark Ioane – player, Junior Warriors & Canberra Raiders
Jeff Lima – player, Melbourne Storm & Kiwis
Constantine Mika – player, Newcastle Knights
Marvin Filipo - Warriors & Newcastle Knights
Frank-Paul Nuuasala – player, Sydney Roosters
Tai Savea – player, Samoa
Jason Taumalolo – player, North Queensland Cowboys
Honeti Tuha - Paramatta eels
Motu Tony – player, Warriors, Kiwis & Hull FC
Lesley Vainikolo – player, Canberra, Bradford & Kiwis. England rugby union representative
Sonny Fai – player, Warriors
Francis Leota – player, Sheffield, Salford, Samoa & Kiwis
Francis Tualau – player, Nrl Canterbury-Bankstown Bulldogs
Ofahiki Ogden – player, Nrl Canterbury-Bankstown Bulldogs & Parramatta Eels
Edward Kosi - NZ Warriors 
Taniela Otukolo - NZ Warriors & Redcliffe Dolphins
Asu Kepaoa - Sydney Roosters & West Tigers
Paul Tuli NZ Warriors & Junior Kiwis
Demitric Vaimauga - NZ Warriors

Rugby union
Jonny Fa'amatuainu – player, Manu Samoa
Sir John Kirwan – former Auckland and All Blacks player, current rugby coach
Taniela Moa – player, Auckland Blues and Tonga
Junior Polu – player, Manu Samoa
Isaia Toeava – player, Auckland Blues and All Blacks
Alfie To'oala – player, Manu Samoa
Sherwin Stowers – player, NZ Sevens, Auckland Blues
Fa'atiga Lemalu – player, Manu Samoa
Piula Fa'asalele – player, Manu Samoa
Timothy Lafaele – player, Japan National Rugby Team and Tokyo Sunwolves
Jamie-Jerry Taulagi – player,  Queensland Reds and Sunwolves teams in Super Rugby & Agen in the French Top 14
Melani Nanai – player, Auckland Blues & Worcester Warriors
Johnny Fa'auli – player,  Chiefs  & Toshiba Brave Lupus
Hendrik Tui - Panasonic Wild Knights, Suntory Sungoliath & Queensland Reds.
Male Sa'u - Melbourne Rebels, Blues & Japan
Tomas Aoake - San Diego Legion, Tasman and North Harbour Bunnings NPC
Lalomilo Lalomilo - Bay of Plenty & Chiefs
Savelio Ropati - Bay of Plenty, Counties Manukau & Manu Samoa 7s
Dwayne Polataivao - Manu Samoa & Moana Pasifika
Ma'ave Joseph Tupe - NZ Rugby 7s, Bay of Plenty & Coco- Cola Red Sparks
Auvasa Falealii - Auckland, Bay Of Plenty, Nevers (France) & Manu Samoa
Daniel Crichton - Otago

Football
Mark Atkinson – former All Whites player

Professional Wrestling
Fale Simitaitoko – Professional wrestler signed to New Japan Pro-Wrestling

See also
 Jean-Baptiste de La Salle
 De La Salle
 Lasallian educational institutions

Notes

External links
School website

Boys' schools in New Zealand
Educational institutions established in 1953
Catholic secondary schools in Auckland
1953 establishments in New Zealand
Auckland
Ōtara-Papatoetoe Local Board Area